George Finley Bovard (August 8, 1856 – September 24, 1932) was the fourth president of the University of Southern California, serving from 1903 to 1921. Bovard administration building is named after him. His brother, Marion McKinley Bovard, was the university's first president.

References

History of USC

George Bovard's obituary

Presidents of the University of Southern California
1856 births
1932 deaths